Euri Gonzalez (born 13 August 1978) is a Dominican professional boxer. He is most known for his fight with Canelo Álvarez.

Professional career

Throughout his career he had won the Dominican Republic, WBO Intercontinental and WBO Latino welterweight titles, beating fellow contenders Raul Pinzon and veteran Cosme Rivera. He was ranked as high as 8th in the world by the WBO in November 2007.

On February 21, 2009 Gonzalez in front of 5,000 fans at the Auditorio Benito Juarez in Zapopan, Jalisco, Mexico lost by K.O. in the eleventh round to top welterweight prospect Canelo Álvarez.

Professional record

|- style="margin:0.5em auto; font-size:95%;"
|align="center" colspan=8|23 Wins (16 knockouts), 3 Losses, 1 Draw
|- style="margin:0.5em auto; font-size:95%;"
|align=center style="border-style: none none solid solid; background: #e3e3e3"|Res.
|align=center style="border-style: none none solid solid; background: #e3e3e3"|Record
|align=center style="border-style: none none solid solid; background: #e3e3e3"|Opponent
|align=center style="border-style: none none solid solid; background: #e3e3e3"|Type
|align=center style="border-style: none none solid solid; background: #e3e3e3"|Rd., Time
|align=center style="border-style: none none solid solid; background: #e3e3e3"|Date
|align=center style="border-style: none none solid solid; background: #e3e3e3"|Location
|align=center style="border-style: none none solid solid; background: #e3e3e3"|Notes
|-align=center
|Win || 23-3-1 ||align=left| Juan Carlos Contreras
| || 4
| || align=left|
|align=left|
|-align=center
|Win || 22-3-1 ||align=left| Jorge Burgos
| || 3 (6)
| || align=left|
|align=left|
|-align=center
|Win || 21-3-1 ||align=left| Juan Carlos Lorenzo
| || 2 (6)
| || align=left|
|align=left|
|-align=center
|Loss || 20-3-1 ||align=left| Jesus Soto Karass
| || 5 (10)
| || align=left|
|align=left|
|-align=center
|Loss || 20-2-1 ||align=left| Ravshan Hudaynazarov
| || 8
| || align=left|
|align=left|
|-align=center

References

External links
 

Sportspeople from Santo Domingo
Welterweight boxers
1978 births
Living people
Dominican Republic male boxers
Pan American Games medalists in boxing
Pan American Games bronze medalists for the Dominican Republic
Boxers at the 1999 Pan American Games
Boxers at the 2003 Pan American Games
Medalists at the 1999 Pan American Games
Medalists at the 2003 Pan American Games